Harold Ramírez González (born 18 July 1972) is a Puerto Rican boxer. He competed in the men's bantamweight event at the 1992 Summer Olympics.

References

External links
 

1972 births
Living people
Puerto Rican male boxers
Olympic boxers of Puerto Rico
Boxers at the 1992 Summer Olympics
Place of birth missing (living people)
Bantamweight boxers
20th-century Puerto Rican people